is a railway station in the city of Oga, Akita, Japan, operated by East Japan Railway Company (JR East).

Lines
Hadachi Station is served by the Oga Line and is located 23.7 rail kilometers from the southern terminus of the Oga Line at ..

Station layout
The station has one side platform, serving a single bidirectional track. The station is unattended.

History
Hadachi Station opened on December 1, 1915. With the privatization of JNR on April 1, 1987, the station has been managed by JR East. It has been unattended since March 2006.

Passenger statistics
In fiscal 2002, the station was used by an average of 370 passengers daily (boarding passengers only).

Surrounding area

See also
 List of railway stations in Japan

References

External links

JR East station information page 

Railway stations in Akita Prefecture
Railway stations in Japan opened in 1915
Oga Line
Oga, Akita